The 2008 Atlantic 10 Conference Baseball Championship was held from May 21 through 24 at Campbell's Field in Camden, New Jersey. It featured the top six regular-season finishers of the conference's 14 teams. Second-seeded Charlotte defeated Xavier in the title game to win the tournament for the second straight year, earning the A-10's automatic bid to the 2008 NCAA Tournament.

Seeding and format 
The league's top six teams, based on winning percentage in the 27-game regular-season schedule, were seeded one through six. The top two seeds, Xavier and Charlotte, received byes into the second round of play in the double elimination tournament.

In the tie for first place, the conference's tiebreaking procedures gave Xavier the top seed.

Bracket

All-Tournament Team 
The following players were named to the All-Tournament Team. Charlotte's Rob Lyerly, one of four 49ers selected, was named Most Outstanding Player.

Duquesne's Bill Torre (2005) was a second-time selection.

Notes 

 This was Duquesne's final appearance in the tournament as the baseball program folded in 2010 due to budget cuts.

References 

Tournament
Atlantic 10 Conference Baseball Tournament
Atlantic 10 Conference baseball tournament
Atlantic 10 Conference baseball tournament
Baseball in New Jersey
College sports in New Jersey
History of Camden, New Jersey
Sports competitions in New Jersey
Sports in Camden, New Jersey
Tourist attractions in Camden, New Jersey